0–9 Series is a 1989 series of ten compilation albums released by ABC for Kids. It won the ARIA Award for Best Children's Album in 1990 and was nominated for the ARIA Award for Best Cover Art in the same year.

The ten albums are aimed at children of each age from 0 to 9: 0 (or Zzzero) for 0 year olds through to 9 (or Nine) for 9 year olds. Over 270 songs were recorded for the album series with 214 appearing on the final products. The diversity provides "For newborns and parents there are lullabies (several in different languages), songs about children and sounds of nature. For tiny tots there are entertaining poems, nonsense tunes, clapping and stomping songs and for pre-teens there are contemporary pop songs that touch on some of today's social issues that concern young people." A documentary, The Making of 0–9 (1989), on the production of the albums was released alongside it. A promotional album, Zzzero–Nine Sampler, was used to advertise the releases.

Artists appearing are Adam Bowen, Aku Kadoga, Andrew Bell, Andrew Can, Angela Webber, Anne Kirkpatrick, Armando Hurley, Barry Crocker, Barry Leef, Chantelle Ormandy, Chris Bailey, Chris Lloyd, Christopher Patlon, Col Joye, Danielle Spencer, Darryl Aberhart, Dave Sandbach, Dave Sandford, Debbie Byrne, Don Spencer, Doug Parkinson, Ernie Dingo, Floyd Vincent, Gillian Eastoe, Gillian Jones, Grace Knight, Graeme Connors, Greedy Smith, Gus O'Brien, James Gillard, Jamie Rigg, Jenny Morris, Jim Conway, Joan Sydney, Joanne Jackson, John Paul Young, John Spence, Jonathan Biggins, Kerrie Biddell, Ketaki Kishor Dongre, Kiri Uu, Lana Warner, Laurie Balmer, Leonora Jackson, Linda Kenny, Linda Marr, Linda Nagle, Lizzie Clear, Lori Vallins, Lucky Starr, Malcolm McCullum, Marc Hunter, Marcus Holden, Margret RoadKnight, Maria Fotiadis, Mark Williams, Maroochy Barambah, Mary Schneider, Melanie Saloman, Mesana Salata, Mic Conway, Mic Conway's Whoopee Band, Mick Layton, Mike Kennings, Moya Simpson, Nicholas Wareham, Normie Rowe, Peter Chambers, Peter Combe, Peter Kenny, Rami Var, Rhonda Burchmore, Rick Price, Robyn Archer, Robyne Dunn, Ross Higgins, Ruth Cracknell, Sabahattin Akdagcik, Sally Dodds, Sharon O'Neill, Shauna Jensen, Stuart Grant, Su Cruickshank, Sweet Atmosphere, Tamina Haider, Tania Bowra, Terry Hannagan, Terry Kaff, Terry Murray, The Moy Sisters, Tommy Emmanuel, Trinidad Calypso Band, Trish Goddard, Wendy Grose, Wendy Matthews and Zachiary Haider.

Albums

Zzzero
Zzzero (836 861-1, 836 861-2, 836 861-4)

One
One (836 862-1, 836 862-2, 836 862-4)

Two
Two (836 863-1, 836 863-2, 836 863-4)

Three
Three (836 864-1, 836 864-2, 836 864-4)

Four
Four (836 865-1, 836 865-2, 836 865-4)

Five
Five (836 866-1, 836 866-2, 836 866-4)

Six
Six (836 867-1, 836 867-2, 836 867-4)

Seven
Seven (836 868-1, 836 868-2, 836 868-4)

Eight
Eight (836 869-1, 836 869-2, 836 869-4)

Nine
Nine (836 870-1, 836 870-2, 836 870-4)

Zzzero–Nine Sampler
Zzzero–Nine Sampler (Kids 1)

This was the promo album for the series containing songs from each album

Notes

References

1989 albums
ARIA Award-winning albums
Children's music albums
Compilation album series